American singer Selena Gomez has released three solo studio albums, two compilation albums, four extended plays (EPs), 35 singles (including 7 as a featured artist) and four promotional singles. Gomez has sold 6.7 million albums worldwide by October 2015. As of May 2017, she has sold 24.3 million songs and 3.4 million albums in the United States. According to the Recording Industry Association of America (RIAA), she has achieved 37.5 million certified units based on sales and on-demand streaming, and a further 16 million as part of Selena Gomez & the Scene, as of October 2022. She has a total of 39 chart entries on the US Billboard Hot 100, including a number one and eight top-ten songs. 

Gomez formed the pop rock band Selena Gomez & the Scene through her record deal with Hollywood Records. After releasing three studio albums, she confirmed in early 2012 that she would be taking a break from music, placing the group on hiatus. Despite earlier claims, she began to work on solo material. Her first solo studio album, Stars Dance, was released in July 2013, and debuted atop the US Billboard 200. Its lead single, "Come & Get It", reached the top ten in the US, Canada, and the United Kingdom. Having spent seven years with Hollywood Records, the singer signed a recording contract with Interscope Records in 2014. To officially end her contract with her former label, she released the compilation album For You (2014), which spawned the US top-ten single "The Heart Wants What It Wants". 

Gomez's second studio album, Revival (2015), debuted at number one in the US, and spawned three US top-ten entries: "Good for You", "Same Old Love", and "Hands to Myself". With these singles, she became the sixth woman to score at least three number-one singles on the Mainstream Top 40 chart from a single set. From 2016–19, she released several standalone singles and collaborations, beginning with the global hit "We Don't Talk Anymore", which reached the top ten in the US, Australia, France, while topping the charts in Italy. She scored international chart toppers with "It Ain't Me", which attained top five peaks in Australia, Canada, Germany and many European countries, and as a guest vocalist on DJ Snake's "Taki Taki", which topped the charts in several Latin American countries and became a success all across Europe—both songs reached the top ten of most major music charts worldwide, attaining top ten peaks in over thirty countries. She also released "Wolves", which achieved worldwide success and reached the top ten in over twenty countries, and the international top-ten single "Back to You". From 2011–18, the singer had a streak of 16 consecutive top 40 hits on the Billboard Hot 100, which is the longest active run of any artist.

Gomez's third studio album, Rare (2020), became her third consecutive number one in the US, and topped the charts in Australia, Canada, and several other territories, peaking at number two in the UK. Its lead single, "Lose You to Love Me", was an international hit and reached the top five of various national charts worldwide, becoming her first number-one song in the US, Canada, and Ireland. Gomez's first Spanish-language project, an EP titled Revelación (2021), debuted at number one on the US Billboard Top Latin Albums chart, becoming the biggest week for a Latin album by a woman since 2017. With this EP and the single "Baila Conmigo", she became the first female act to lead the US Latin Albums and Latin Airplay charts simultaneously in over a decade. Her collaboration with Rema on the remix of "Calm Down" was an international success, peaking at number three on the Billboard Global 200.

Albums

Studio albums

Compilation albums

Extended plays

Singles

As lead artist

As featured artist

Promotional singles

Other charted songs

See also
List of songs recorded by Selena Gomez

Footnotes

References

External links
 Official website
 Selena Gomez at AllMusic
 
 

Discography
Pop music discographies
Discographies of American artists